Prohysterophora is a genus of moths belonging to the family Tortricidae.

Species
Prohysterophora chionopa (Meyrick, 1891)

See also
List of Tortricidae genera

References

 , 1961: Studies on the Cochylidae (Lepidoptera). Part VI. Remarks on types of some Cochylidae. Polskie Pismo Entomologiczne, Polish Journal of Entomology 31: 301–319.

External links
tortricidae.com

Cochylini
Tortricidae genera